Polgahawela is a town located in north western Sri Lanka.  It is most notable for being a major railway junction.

It is the location of an important railway junction in Sri Lanka Railways' network, connecting the Main Line, which runs from Colombo to Badulla and the Northern Line, which runs through to the northern port of Kankesanthurai.

Railway station 

Polgahawela's railway station is at the centre of the town and lies at the main junction of the Main Line and the Northern Line.

The town is notable for a major railway accident that occurred in 2005.

Neighbouring stations 
Pothuhera
Allawwa
Polgahawela
Panaliiya
Thismalpola
Rambukkana

Notable people 
 Malcolm Ranjith, Archbishop of Colombo and a cardinal, was born here.
 Gregory Shantha Kumara Francis, the Bishop of Kurunegala, was born here

See also 
 Transport in Sri Lanka
 Railway stations in Sri Lanka
 Mahamevnawa Buddhist Monastery

References 

Populated places in North Western Province, Sri Lanka